Empalme Villa Constitución (often shortened to Empalme) is a town (comuna) in the south of the province of Santa Fe, Argentina.

Overview
Its name, which means junction in Spanish, alludes to its location at the junction of the main Buenos Aires–Rosario railway and a short line coming from the port of Villa Constitución, which was opened in 1886.

References

External links

Populated places in Santa Fe Province